Begotten may refer to:

Religion
Only-begotten Son
Monogenēs, only begotten in the New Testament and Christian theology

Film and TV
Begotten, a 1989 experimental horror film written, edited, produced, and directed by E. Elias Merhige
"The Begotten", a 1997 episode of the television series Star Trek: Deep Space Nine

Books
"The Begotten", poem by James L. McMichael
Star Begotten, 1937 novel by H. G. Wells
Only Begotten Daughter, 1990 fantasy novel written by James Morrow